Henry Isador Harris (1899–1971) was an English cinematographer. He was born in Lambeth, South London, and died in Midhurst, Sussex.

Selected filmography

 Claude Duval (1924)
 Shooting Stars (1927)
 The Runaway Princess (1929)
 No Exit (1930)
 The School for Scandal (1930)
 Almost a Divorce (1931)
 Two White Arms (1932)
 The Wonderful Story (1932)
 Chelsea Life (1933)
 Lord of the Manor (1933)
 Purse Strings (1933)
 The Price of Wisdom (1935)
 Secret of Stamboul (1936)
 The Street Singer (1937)
 Smash and Grab (1937)
 The Sky's the Limit (1938)
 Band Waggon (1940)
 This Man in Paris (1940)
 You Will Remember (1941)
 Up for the Cup (1950)

References

External links
 

1899 births
1971 deaths
English cinematographers
Artists from London